The Cathedral Basilica of Our Lady of Peace (French: Cathédrale de Notre Dame de la Paix; Portuguese: Catedral de Nossa Senhora da Paz; Hawaiian: Malia o ka Malu Hale Pule Nui; Latin: Basilicæ cathedralis Sanctæ Mariæ de Pace) is the mother church of the Diocese of Honolulu and houses the cathedra of the Bishop of Honolulu in Honolulu, Hawaii. It is located at the north end of Fort Street Mall in downtown Honolulu. Another cathedra was installed in the Co-Cathedral of Saint Theresa of the Child Jesus, also serving the diocese.

The Congregation for Divine Worship and the Discipline of the Sacraments conferred the title of Minor Basilica upon the Cathedral on May 10, 2014, the liturgical memorial of St. Damien. The inaugural Mass was celebrated on October 11, 2014, the fifth anniversary of the canonization of St. Damien.

The cathedral basilica was built during Hawaii's missionary era and served as the mother church of the Vicariate Apostolic of the Hawaiian Islands. It was dedicated by Msgr. Louis-Désiré Maigret on August 15, 1843, under the title of Our Lady of Peace or Malia O Ka Malu. 
It is said to be the oldest cathedral in continuous use as a cathedral in the United States as well as the church in which Saint Damien of Molokai was ordained to the presbyterate on May 21, 1864. For these reasons, the Cathedral Basilica of Our Lady of Peace was placed on the National Register of Historic Places in 1972. Though older, the Basilica of the National Shrine of the Assumption of the Blessed Virgin Mary in the Archdiocese of Baltimore was a co-cathedral throughout most of its history and the Saint Louis Cathedral in the Archdiocese of New Orleans was closed for a long period of time in its history.

History

Groundbreaking
After some years of persecution of Roman Catholicism in the Hawaiian Islands (partly instigated by Congregationalist and Presbyterian missionaries who had befriended Kings Kamehameha II, Kamehameha III, and Kaahumanu, and partly arising from Hawaiian opposition to French influence), the Hawaiian government issued an Edict of Toleration creating freedom of religious expression. As an act of reconciliation, Kamehameha III gave the first Roman Catholic missionaries under the leadership of Apostolic Vicar Étienne Rouchouze a piece of the royal estate on which to build the first Roman Catholic church in the kingdom.

The missionaries broke ground for the new church on July 9, 1840. It coincided with the Feast of Our Lady of Peace, patroness of the Congregation of the Sacred Hearts of Jesus and Mary religious institute, of which the missionaries were members. The missionaries gave that title to their first foundation in the new land. A Mass was celebrated on the day of groundbreaking, when 280 native Hawaiians received the sacraments of baptism, confirmation, and first Eucharist.

The cornerstone of the building was ceremonially laid on August 6, 1840. Construction continued after groundbreaking with native Hawaiian volunteers harvesting blocks of coral from the shores of Ala Moana, Kakaako, and Waikīkī. Down the street, Congregationalist missionaries had earlier begun the construction of Kawaiahao Church.

Development

On August 15, 1843, the Cathedral Basilica of Our Lady of Peace was consecrated and dedicated. It is the oldest existing building in the "downtown" area of the city of Honolulu.

Several bishops in residence at the Cathedral Basilica of Our Lady of Peace commissioned renovations. When Louis Desire Maigret inherited the church as corporation sole by virtue of his office of bishop, the interior was furnished with a simple wooden altar, communion rail and pulpit. The floors were covered in lauhala leaf mats. The cathedra, also known then as the bishop's throne, was imported and installed. Throughout his term as bishop, Maigret also raised the ceiling, added a choir loft and galleries overlooking the nave and paneled the ceilings with bronze ornaments. Extensive marble work was done with the installation of a French marble altar. It was crowned by a triptych featuring statues of Our Lady of Peace looked upon by Saint Joachim and Saint Anne. The most prominent exterior achievement for Maigret was the installation of the first domed bell tower in the Hawaiian Islands. In 1866, the domed bell tower was stripped from the exterior by Maigret and replaced with a wooden spire topped with a cross.

On December 24, 1893, Msgr. Gulstan Ropert dedicated a bronze statue of Our Lady of Peace, hoisted onto a pedestal with plaques on four sides engraved in English, French, Portuguese and Hawaiian with the words, "In memory of the first Roman Catholic Church, Our Lady of Peace 1827 to 1893." The statue was a recreation of an original 16th century wooden carving still venerated in the Paris convent of the Congregation of the Sacred Hearts of Jesus and Mary.

When Libert Hubert John Louis Boeynaems inherited the church as corporation sole, he idealized the Cathedral Basilica of Our Lady of Peace to possibly become a beautiful Gothic cathedral similar to the more famous European churches of his homeland. He commissioned the renovation of the cathedral; its first phase was the construction of an elaborate porch at the cathedral facade. The first phase was completed in 1910. In 1917, Boeynaems stripped the wooden spire from the exterior in favor of a concrete bell tower with clock. The Gothic architecture did not match the Fort Street surroundings and became too costly for the apostolic vicariate to complete other phases. The Gothic dream died with Boeynaems.

When Stephen Peter Alencastre assumed the episcopacy of the Hawaiian Islands, he stripped the Cathedral of Our Lady of Peace of all vestiges of its Gothic experiment. The Gothic porch was torn down, and the walls were covered in plaster and painted white. Red Spanish terra cotta tiles covered the cathedral roof. In anticipation for the celebration of the centennial of the arrival of the first Roman Catholic missionaries to the Hawaiian Islands, the Italian government presented a gift of a new white marble altar with statues of the Blessed Virgin Mary and Saint Joseph, parents of Jesus. Upon the completion of his construction projects, Alencastre established the Cathedral Basilica of Our Lady of Peace's present-day Romanesque revival style.

Pipe organ
The first pipe organ, installed shortly after the cathedral was built, came from France and had one manual and a pedal clavier. The second organ, installed in 1885, was built in England as the gift of parishioner Godfrey Rhodes, featuring great, swell, and pedal organs. The large statue of Saint Cecilia, patroness of sacred music, was placed on the casing in front of the organ in 1906. Because of wear, the vicariate decided to move the 1885 instrument next door to the Columbus Welfare Building for use during choir rehearsal. A new instrument, the third and present one, consisting of great, swell, choir, and pedal organs was installed in the choir loft by organ-builder Alfred G. Tickner of the Aeolian-Skinner Organ Company of Boston. This instrument was solemnly blessed on September 9, 1934, by Msgr. Stephen Alencastre, followed by a dedicatory recital by organist Don George, broadcast over radio station KGU in Honolulu.

After the Second Vatican Council
Liturgically innovative ideas in the 1960s and 1970s took hold of some liturgists and theologians after the Second Vatican Council. These ideas, which claimed to follow the "spirit of the council" rather than its actual texts, inaugurated controversial changes in some of the architectural standards of churches in dioceses worldwide. James Joseph Sweeney, first bishop of Honolulu and United States delegate to the ecumenical council that met in the Basilica of Saint Peter at the Vatican City, instituted renovations of the Cathedral Basilica of Our Lady of Peace, which some Catholics dubbed a "wreckovation" rather than a restoration. Sweeney ordered the removal of the marble communion rails and installed a freestanding marble altar that faced the congregation, and reoriented the pews in a circular fashion around the altar. The canopied pulpit that was perched above the congregation was also removed in favor of a simple ambo and lectern from which the Gospels could be proclaimed and homilies and sermons could be delivered. The wooden cross atop the old altar was stripped and replaced with a sculptured marble crucifix. The ideology of that time encouraged churches to use native cultural implements in church architecture. Sweeney's cathedral rector, Monsignor Charles Kekumano, installed koa wood wainscot along the walls. The cathedral's doors were also replaced by heavy koa wood doors.

Restoration

Changes begun by Sweeney were completed under Joseph Anthony Ferrario, third bishop of Honolulu. Ferrario also inaugurated the beginning phases of ambitious restoration work. His cathedral rectors, Monsignor Terrence A. M. Watanabe and his successor Nathan Mamo, were responsible for sending the clerestory statues of saints perched over the nave of the church back to France, where they were professionally preserved. When the statues returned, they were installed above the nave of the church but in a new, more logical order of placement in accordance with the Litany of the Saints.

Francis Xavier DiLorenzo, fourth bishop of Honolulu continued his predecessor's ambitious renovation projects. Architects were hired to draft plans for an expansion of the Cathedral Basilica of Our Lady of Peace, including the construction of a new chapel using land upon which the famous courtyard statue of Our Lady of Peace now stands. DiLorenzo's capital improvement projects, administered by his cathedral rectors Gary Secor and later Roland Pacudan, included the replacement of the flooring with stone tiles and installation of new sound systems. Pews and kneelers were restored, also. A traditional baptismal font was replaced with the construction of a large baptismal reflective pool and fountain.

A $13–16M campaign to renovate, restore, and renew the cathedral basilica was initiated by the current bishop Clarence Silva and cathedral basilica rector John Berger around 2010. The overarching theme for the building committee has been to capture the essence of St. Damien de Veuster, restoring the cathedral basilica to appearance of the later 1800s. The "renewal" project also includes installing replica paintings of the Stations of the Cross that were present in the cathedral basilica during the time period of St. Damien, new wooden pews and restoring the seating to the ad orientem arrangement, "gas lighting" chandeliers, replacing the pipe organ (the oldest in the state), and landscaping around the roughly 15,000-square-foot building, which sits on about a quarter-acre of land. There are plans to build a new chapel on the property that will house the relics of both St. Damien de Veuster and St. Marianne Cope, whose mortal remains were enshrined at the cathedral on July 31, 2014. In addition to the superficial physical changes to the external and internal appearance of the cathedral basilica, plans for the restoration include fixing the church foundation, an air conditioning system, controlling possible termite damage again in the future, a sound system, and a lighting system.

Current status

The Most Rev. Clarence Richard Silva, fifth bishop of Honolulu, is the current pastor. He is currently served at the Cathedral Basilica of Our Lady of Peace by the cathedral rector and parochial vicar. A member of the laity is appointed as pastoral associate and manages the church services, parish council and rectory. Several retired priests in residence at the chancery and the adjacent Century Square building often administer the sacraments of the Eucharist and reconciliation during the week.

Campus
The church at 1175 Fort Street Mall is just one building in a larger Cathedral Basilica of Our Lady Peace campus, owned by the Diocese of Honolulu and purchased during the Hawaiian Kingdom Era from Charles Brewer, Charles Reed Bishop, Julius Anthon, Joseph Carter, Alexander Muir, James Makee and Romila Whiting. Much of the land was formerly used as a boarding and day school in the late 1800s – the predecessor institution of Saint Louis School. The campus includes the Chancery building at 1184 Bishop Street, from which the Bishop of Honolulu administers his executive powers as corporation sole. The Chancery also houses the offices of the vicar general and the Hawaii Catholic Herald newspaper. The same high-rise building also houses the rectory, the office and residence of the rector, the parochial vicar and other priests serving the Cathedral Basilica of Our Lady of Peace.

The diocese has leased some of the campus to commercial entities. The Century Square building, a modern skyscraper at 1188 Bishop Street, is rented as office and residential space. Among its tenants is the television studio of KIKU, the local UPN television network affiliate. The parish hall is the "Kamiano Center", in honor of Father Damien de Veuster. Also part of the campus is the Finance Factors building at 1164 Bishop Street. The diocese provides space to small businesses as offices and to Hawaii Pacific University as classrooms. The parent company of Finance Factors is a minority owner of the land on which the building was constructed. Directly beneath the campus is a cavernous basin dug by early missionaries as a freshwater well. It is now leased to a private company which operates it as an underground public parking lot.

See also

Saint Damien of Molokai
Saint Marianne Cope
Cathedral Church of Saint Andrew, Honolulu
Co-Cathedral of Saint Theresa of the Child Jesus
List of the Roman Catholic bishops of the United States
List of Catholic cathedrals in the United States
List of cathedrals in the United States
List of the Roman Catholic dioceses of the United States
List of basilicas

References

External links

Official Cathedral Site
Roman Catholic Diocese of Honolulu Official Site
French in Hawaii by Hawaii History
Life in Hawaii by Titus Coan
USCCB minor basilica

Roman Catholic churches completed in 1843
Romanesque Revival architecture in Hawaii
Romanesque Revival church buildings in the United States
Our Lady of Peace, Cathedral Basilica of
Our Lady of Peace
Roman Catholic churches in Hawaii
Minor basilicas in the United States
Churches on the National Register of Historic Places in Hawaii
Roman Catholic churches in Honolulu
Historic American Buildings Survey in Hawaii
1843 establishments in Hawaii
National Register of Historic Places in Honolulu
19th-century Roman Catholic church buildings in the United States